Wales Glacier is a short alpine glacier just west of Mount Barnes at the east end of the Kukri Hills. It drains through Wales Stream, north into Taylor Valley in Victoria Land. Named by the British Antarctic Expedition (1910–13) under Scott.

Glaciers of Victoria Land
McMurdo Dry Valleys